The Telegraphkhane building (Persian: ساختمان تلگرافخانه) or the Postkhane building (Persian: ساختمان پستخانه) was a building in Tehran, Iran, that was used as museum of post and telegraph. It was built during the reign of Reza Shah Pahlavi in Toopkhaneh square, and was destroyed in 1970.

History 
After the coronation of Reza Shah Pahlavi, Karim Buzarjomehri became the mayor of Tehran. As his first action, he redesigned the Toopkhaneh square with the help a Russian architect inspired by a city square in Saint Petersburg. 

The Telegraphkhane building was created in 3 parts and was around 150 meters long, and faced the municipality building. It had a columned entrance with a dome that had a square base. The building had 22 decorated columns that gave it a very spectacular look.

It was later destroyed in 1970 for unknown reasons, just like the municipality building.

References 

Demolished buildings and structures in Iran
Pahlavi Iran